The Third Fisher ministry (Labor) was the 10th ministry of the Government of Australia. It was led by the country's 5th Prime Minister, Andrew Fisher. The Third Fisher ministry succeeded the Cook ministry, which dissolved on 17 September 1914 following the federal election that took place on 5 September which saw Labor defeat Joseph Cook's Liberals. The ministry was replaced by the First Hughes ministry on 27 October 1915 following Fisher's retirement from Parliament to become the next High Commissioner to the United Kingdom.

Billy Hughes, who died in 1952, was the last surviving member of the Third Fisher ministry; Hughes was also the last surviving member of the Watson ministry, First Fisher ministry, Second Hughes ministry and Third Hughes ministry.

Ministry

References

Ministries of George V
Fisher, 3
Australian Labor Party ministries
1914 establishments in Australia
1915 disestablishments in Australia
Cabinets established in 1914
Cabinets disestablished in 1915